The Old Jewish Cemetery of Frankfurt is located at Rat-Beil-Straße ("Councillor Beil Street") directly adjacent to the oldest parts of the gentile Frankfurt Main Cemetery. Together, Frankfurt Main Cemetery, the Old Jewish Cemetery and the New Jewish Cemetery constitute one of the largest cemetery areas in Germany. The Old Jewish Cemetery is noted for many monumental graves and includes the graves of many notable individuals. The Old Jewish Cemetery is the largest of Frankfurt's twelve Jewish cemeteries.

It was opened, together with the Main Cemetery, in 1828. By 1928, when the cemetery was closed for new graves because it was full, there were around 40,000 burials on the cemetery. Since 1928, interment has only been possible in already established (family) graves. In its place, the New Jewish Cemetery was opened in 1928.

Notable graves 
 Salomon Breuer (1850–1926), rabbi
 Emma Budge (1852–1937), art collector and philanthropist
 Leopold Cassella (1766–1847), businessman and founder of Cassella
 Paul Ehrlich (1854–1915), Nobel Prize laureate in medicine (block 114 N)
 Ludwig Aaron Gans (1794–1871), businessman and owner of Cassella
 Charles Hallgarten (1838–1908), banker and social reformer
 Samson Raphael Hirsch (1808–1888), rabbi
 Markus Horovitz (1844–1910), rabbi
 Joseph Johlson (1777–1851), reform pedagogue and religious scholar
 Isaac Löw Königswarter (1818–1877), banker
 Isidor Kracauer (1852–1923), historian
 Nehemia Anton Nobel (1871–1922), rabbi
 Moritz Daniel Oppenheim (1800–1882), painter
 Bertha Pappenheim (1859–1936), women's rights pioneer
 Saul Pinchas Rabbinowicz (1845–1910), author
 Amschel Mayer von Rothschild (1773–1855), banker and philanthropist
 Gutle Rothschild (1753–1849), wife of Mayer Amschel Rothschild, founder of the Rothschild banking family
 Hannah Luise von Rothschild (1850–1892), philanthropist
 Louise von Rothschild (1820–1894), philanthropist
 Mathilde von Rothschild (1832–1924), philanthropist 
 Mayer Carl von Rothschild (1820–1886), banker and politician 
 Wilhelm Carl von Rothschild (1828–1901), banker and politician
 Heinrich Schwarzschild (1803–1878), physician and poet
 Max Seckbach (1866–1922), architect
 Leopold Sonnemann (1831–1909), publisher and founder of Frankfurter Zeitung
 Georg Speyer (1835–1902), banker
 Theodor Stern (1937–1900), banker and politician
 Israel von Stolin (1869–1921), rabbi
 Karl Weigert (1845–1904), pathologist

Literature
Victor von Brauchitsch, Helga von Brauchitsch: Zum Gedenken – Grabmale in Frankfurt am Main. Kramer, Frankfurt am Main 1988, .
Peter Braunholz, Britta Boerdner, Christian Setzepfandt: Der Frankfurter Hauptfriedhof. Bildband. Societäts-Verlag, Frankfurt am Main 2009, .
Isidor Kracauer: Geschichte der Juden in Frankfurt a. M. (1150–1824). 2 vols., J. Kauffmann, Frankfurt am Main 1925/27.
Eugen Mayer: Die Frankfurter Juden. Blicke in die Vergangenheit. Verlag Waldemar Kramer, Frankfurt am Main 1966.
Valentin Senger, Klaus Meier-Ude: Die jüdischen Friedhöfe in Frankfurt am Main. Fachhochschulverlag, Frankfurt am Main 2004, pp. 10–20

References

External links
  

1828 establishments in Germany
Buildings and structures in Frankfurt
Tourist attractions in Frankfurt
Jews and Judaism in Frankfurt